Jillye Station is a railway station in South Korea. It is on the Gyeongjeon Line and the Busansinhang Line. The Busansinhang Line connects to Busansinhang (New Busan Port).

Railway stations in South Gyeongsang Province